The Latin language has a robust diminutive-forming system. There are many diminutive suffixes: those in calculus, axilla, fistula, and areola to start. There is often more than one correct way to form a diminutive, and many more incorrect ones.

Gender 
The masculine, feminine, and neuter diminutives often end in -us, -a, and -um. 
 later, -is (m.) > later-cul-us (m.)
 mulier, -is (f.) > mulier-cul-a (f.)
 tūber, -is (n.) > tūber-cul-um (n.)

There are exceptions. These masculine words end in -a:
 scurr-a (m.) > scurr-ul-a (m.)
 vern-a (m.) > vern-ul-a (m.)

Many have a vowel, followed by one or two ls, followed by the endings just mentioned. Here we see stem + 'ul' + ending.

The rules can be a bit involved. The diminutive depends on the gender, declination (first, second, etc) and the root's ending.

First and second declination

Conspectus parvus

Regula Generalis

Stirpes in vocalem exeuntes 

In the first declanation, -ia can become =illa or =ola. (Lucia → Lucilla, sed Tullia → Tulliola).

Roots with -ul-  
Nomina quorum stirps exit in -ul- (seu principalia seu deminutiva) in deminutione (seu prima seu secunda) illud -ul- mutant in -ell- aut -ill-. Regulam tamen discernere difficile est. In tabula supposita multorum vocabulorum quorum stirps in -ul- exit deminutiva data sunt. Eis quae ipsa deminutiva sunt, principalia sunt praeposita, significatu tamen admodum differentia in parenthesibus inclusa. Qui systema viderit, dicat!

Roots with -r-

Roots with -n-

Roots with -xill-

Exceptions

Third declination 

in -es, -is & -e

More nouns, third declination

Nouns in -ēs, -is

Nouns in -is, -is (m./f.) or -ĕ, -is (n.)

Roots with -c- & -g-

Roots with -t- et -d-

Roots with -p- et -b-

Roots with -n-

Roots with -r(r)- et -l(l)-et -s-

Roots with -r- and -s-

Roots with -u- et -v-

Stirpes in duas aut plures consonantes exeuntes

Fourth declination

Fifth declination 

Latin grammar